EDK may refer to:
 El Dorado/Captain Jack Thomas Memorial Airport, in Kansas, United States
 El Dorado Kitchen, an American restaurant
 Euro death-knot, a knot
Erfgoedcentrum Nederlands Kloosterleven (Heritage Centre for Dutch Monastic Life) in Sint Agatha, NL.